The lieutenant governor of Vermont is elected for a two-year term and chosen separately from the governor. The Vermont Lieutenant Governor's main responsibilities include acting as governor when the governor is out of state or incapacitated, presiding over the Vermont Senate, casting tie-breaking votes in the Senate when required, and acceding to the governorship in case of a vacancy. As a member of the state senate's Committee on Committees, the lieutenant governor plays a role in determining committee assignments for individual senators, as well as selecting committee chairs, vice chairs, and clerks.

Mountain rule
From the founding of the Republican Party in the 1850s until the 1960s only Republicans won general elections for Vermont's statewide offices.  One method that made this possible was imposition of the "Mountain Rule."  Under the provisions of the Mountain Rule, one U.S. Senator was a resident of the east side of the Green Mountains and one resided on the west side, and the governorship and lieutenant governorship alternated between residents of the east and west side.  Nominees for governor and lieutenant governor were allowed two one-year terms, and later one two-year term.  For nearly 100 years likely Republican candidates for office in Vermont agreed to abide by the Mountain Rule in the interests of party unity.  Several factors led to the eventual weakening of the Mountain Rule, including: the longtime political dispute between the Proctor (conservative) and Aiken-Gibson (liberal) wings of the party; primaries rather than conventions to select nominees; the direct election of U.S. Senators; and several active third parties, including the Progressives, the Prohibition Party, and the Local Option movement.  In the 1960s the rise of the Vermont Democratic Party and the construction of Interstate 89 also contributed to the end of the Mountain Rule.  Though I-89 is a north–south route, it traverses Vermont from east to west and changed the way Vermonters view how the state is divided.

Vacancies
Vermont has no provision for filling the lieutenant governor's office in the event of a vacancy, and it has been vacant four times.  Thomas Chittenden died in August 1797 while serving as governor, and Lieutenant Governor Paul Brigham served until the end of Chittenden's term in October.  Brigham, the winner of that year's September election for lieutenant governor, began his new term in October and was succeeded as governor by Isaac Tichenor.  In February 1870, Governor Peter T. Washburn died and George Whitman Hendee became governor.  The lieutenant governor's office remained vacant until George N. Dale, the winner of that September's election, took office in October.  In January 1950, Governor Ernest W. Gibson Jr. resigned and Harold J. Arthur became governor.  The lieutenant governor's office was vacant until Joseph B. Johnson, the winner of the 1950 election, took office in January 1951.  In August 1991, Governor Richard A. Snelling died and Howard Dean succeeded him.  The lieutenant governorship remained vacant until Snelling's widow Barbara, the winner of the 1992 election, took office in January 1993.

List of lieutenant governors
Here is a list of lieutenant governors of Vermont in chronological order:

As the independent Vermont Republic

As the U.S. state of Vermont
Parties
 (7)
 (5)
 (1)
 (57)
 (10)
 (1)

 Italics denote a governor of a different party than the lieutenant governor.

References

External links
Office of Lt. Governor David Zuckerman

Lieutenant Governors
 
Vermont